Bình Tân is a rural district (huyện) of Vĩnh Long province in the Mekong Delta region of Vietnam.

Districts of Vĩnh Long province

vi:Bình Tân